Regional elections were held in France on 15 March 1998. At stake were the presidencies of each of France's 26 regions, which, though they don't have legislative autonomy, manage sizeable budgets.

The parliamentary right, led by the conservative Gaullist Rally for the Republic and the centre-right Union for French Democracy won the presidency of 15 of the 26 regions, the rest were won by the French Socialist Party and its allies (Communists, Greens, Radicals). The far-right National Front obtained good results, increasing its number of seats. The far-left and Hunting, Fishing, Nature, Tradition also won seats on various regional councils.

The election was held using a one-round proportional system (with a 5% threshold), later abolished for the 2004 elections.

Presidents of the Regional Council

 Alsace: Adrien Zeller (UDF-FD, UMP)
 Aquitaine : Alain Rousset (PS)
 Auvergne : Valéry Giscard d'Estaing (UDF, UMP)
 Burgundy : Jean-Pierre Soisson (MDR-UDF, UMP) FN support
 Brittany : Josselin de Rohan (RPR, UMP)
 Champagne-Ardenne : Jean-Claude Étienne (RPR, UMP)
 Corse : José Rossi (RPR, UMP)
 Franche-Comté : Jean-François Humbert (UDF-PPDF, UMP)
 Guadeloupe : Lucette Michaux-Chevry (RPR, UMP)
 Guyane : Antoine Karam (PSG)
 Île-de-France : Jean-Paul Huchon (PS)
 Languedoc-Roussillon : Jacques Blanc (DL, UMP) FN support
 Limousin : Robert Savy (PS)
 Lorraine : Gérard Longuet (RPR, UMP)
 Martinique : Alfred Marie-Jeanne (MIM)
 Midi-Pyrénées : Martin Malvy (PS)
 Nord-Pas de Calais : Michel Delebarre (PS)
 Lower Normandy : René Garrec (DL, UMP)
 Upper Normandy : Alain Le Vern (PS)
 Pays de la Loire : François Fillon (RPR, UMP)
 Picardy : Charles Baur (UDF-FD, DVD, UMP) FN support
 Poitou-Charentes : Jean-Pierre Raffarin (UDF-DL, DL, UMP) replaced by Elisabeth Morin (UMP) CPNT support
 Provence-Alpes-Côte d'Azur : Michel Vauzelle (PS)
 Réunion : Paul Vergès (PCR)
 Rhône-Alpes : Charles Millon (UDF-DL, DLC) replaced by Anne-Marie Comparini (UDF)

External links
Election-Politique Regional Elections since 1986 (in french)

1998
1998 elections in France